Kéniéba is a rural commune, small town and seat of Kéniéba Cercle in Mali's Kayes Region, near the Mali–Senegal border. As well as the main town, the commune includes 26 other villages. In the 2009 census the commune had a population of 39,557.

Kéniéba is located in the gold-rich region of Bambouk.

Climate

Twin towns
Kéniéba is twinned with the following towns:
  Tonopah, Nevada, United States

References

External links
.

Communes of Kayes Region